Uganda has formal diplomatic relations with many countries, some accredited. Since the colonial era and after independence Uganda has grown to be one of the most important African countries. Uganda has diplomatic relations with many countries throughout Africa, the Americas, Asia, Europe and Oceania. Uganda is a member of the United Nations and the Commonwealth of Nations since 1962.

Africa

Americas

Asia

Europe

Oceania

International organisations

Uganda has been a member of the United Nations and the Commonwealth of Nations since independence in 1962.

See also
Foreign support of Uganda in the Uganda–Tanzania War
Ministry of Foreign Affairs (Uganda)
List of diplomatic missions in Uganda
List of diplomatic missions of Uganda

References

 
Uganda and the Commonwealth of Nations